What Every Woman Knows is a four-act play written by J. M. Barrie. It was first presented by impresario Charles Frohman at the Duke of York's Theatre in London on 3 September 1908. It ran for 384 performances, transferring to the Hicks Theatre between 21 December 1908 and 15 February 1909.

The play was first produced in America, also by Frohman, in 1908 at Atlantic City on 18 October 1908, transferring to Broadway, at the Empire Theatre in New York City in December 1908. The production starred Maude Adams and Richard Bennett.

Written before women's suffrage, the play posits that "every woman knows" she is the invisible power responsible for the successes of the men in her life.

1908 casts
London
 
John Shand – Gerald du Maurier
Alick Wylie – Henry Vibart
David Wylie – Sydney Valentine
James Wylie – Edmund Gwenn
Maggie Wylie – Hilda Trevelyan
Charles Venables – Norman Forbes
Comtesse de la Briere – Mrs. Tree
Lady Sybil Lazenby – Lillah McCarthy 
Maid – Madge Murray

Atlantic City and New York

John Shand – Richard Bennett
Alick Wylie – R. Payton Carter
David Wylie – David Torrence
James Wylie – Fred Tyler 
Maggie Wylie – Maude Adams
Charles Venables – Lumsden Hare
Comtesse de la Briere – Ffolliott Paget
Lady Sybil Lazenby – Beatrice Agnew
Maid – Lillian Spencer
First Elector – James L. Carhart
Second Elector – Wallace Jackson
Third Elector – W. H. Gilmore

Synopsis
The Wylies, a well-to-do but uneducated Scottish family, are concerned about their daughter, Maggie, a plain young woman who they fear, will remain a spinster. One night the Wylies discover that a serious young university student, John Shand, has been breaking into their home so that he can read books from their large library. Shand is penniless and cannot afford to buy books for his law school education. Maggie Wylie and John Shand come to an understanding: that her family will fund his education if, at the end of five years, he agrees to marry her.

John honours his commitment to Maggie, marrying her although he does not love her. Recognising her husband's ambition to become a Member of Parliament, Maggie quietly uses her intelligence and her connections behind the scenes to get John elected. She continues to foster his career, never allowing him to see that she is the power behind his rise to fame.

Eventually John begins to believe that his wife is too plain for a man of his stature and position, and he takes up with Lady Sybil Lazenby, a beautiful, refined and high-born young Englishwoman. Maggie is prepared to let her husband go, if Sybil can help him more than she herself can. However, when Shand is preparing a speech that will make or break his career, he finds that Sybil is no help to him, and he realises that Maggie is his inspiration.

Performance history

What Every Woman Knows was popular on Broadway, enjoying 198 performances during its first run. Helen Hayes starred in the 1926 Broadway revival, which ran 268 performances.

A British silent film version was made in 1917 and an American silent film was produced in 1921. The play was later adapted into a 1934 film starring Helen Hayes and Brian Aherne.

The play has been revived numerous times since throughout the English-speaking world, including productions at the Gateway Theatre in Edinburgh in 1953, at the Old Vic in 1960, with Maggie Smith as Maggie and Donald Houston as John, and the Albery Theatre in 1974, with Dorothy Tutin and Peter Egan.

What Every Woman Knows starring Helen Hayes was the opening production of the Huntington Hartford Theater in 1954. The Hartford was Los Angeles's prime venue for Broadway-scale productions the next ten years.

The play's most recent London revival was at the Finborough Theatre in 2010. In 1976 in New York, Fran Brill was awarded the Drama Desk Award for her portrayal of Maggie Wylie. In 1977 there was a musical version entitled Maggie at the Shaftesbury Theatre in London.

Noel and Company presented a staged reading of the play at the Mint Theater in New York City in 2013, directed by David Glenn Armstrong and produced by Anne Kaufman. The cast included Carole Shelley, Aedin Maloney, Robert Sella, Heidi Armbruster, Kevin Collins, Alex Rice and John Windsor-Cunningham.

References

External links

Project Gutenberg etext of What Every Woman Knows

1947 Theatre Guild on the Air radio adaptation at Internet Archive

1908 plays
Comedy plays
Plays by J. M. Barrie
West End plays
British plays adapted into films
Plays set in London